Maria Vos (1824-1906) was a Dutch still-life painter.

Biography
She was born to the family of a stockbroker. She originally studied what would now be called "home economics" at a French boarding school in Weesp.  But, as was common for upper-class young ladies at the time, she also received drawing lessons, from Christiaan Andriessen. Later, she studied painting with Petrus Kiers. In 1844, she had a showing at the Exhibition of Living Masters and, in 1847, became an honorary member of the "Royal Academy of Fine Arts" in Amsterdam.

She worked there until 1853, when she moved to Oosterbeek and joined a group of painters known as the Hollandse Barbizon. In 1863, her friend, Adriana Johanna Haanen, the sister-in-law of her teacher, Kiers, joined her there. Seven years later, they built a home known as the "Villa Grada", where they gave drawing and painting lessons. Haanen died in 1895, but Vos remained and became one of the last artists in residence there. On her eightieth birthday, she received a personal tribute from seventy members of Arti et Amicitiae.

Although Vos is primarily known for still lifes, she also did portraits, landscapes and cityscapes, including a series of watercolors depicting Oosterbeek. She mostly exhibited in the Netherlands and Belgium, but also had a showing at the Centennial Exposition in Philadelphia. Much of her work has been lost (or misplaced), but due to the sheer quantity of her output, much remains. Major retrospectives of her work were held in 1973 and 2002.

Selected paintings

References

Further reading
Martina Maria Doornik-Hoogenraad, Maria Vos: een Gelderse schilderes 1824-1906 (exhibition catalog), Stedelijk Museum Zutphen, 1973

External links 

Maria Vos on Artnet	
	

1824 births
1906 deaths
Dutch women painters
Painters from Amsterdam
19th-century Dutch painters
19th-century Dutch women artists
Dutch still life painters